The Toy Train Reference Library is a library for members of the Train Collectors Association (TCA) and the public. It has material about the history of the toy train industry and is located in the Train Collectors Association Headquarters building in Strasburg, Pennsylvania, US.  Also in the building is the National Toy Train Museum.

It is open to all visitors, and contains a collection of information on the history and characteristics of toy trains, and the industry that produced them, in the United States and around the world.

References

External links
 Website

Libraries in Pennsylvania
Model railroads